Hacelia is a genus of echinoderms belonging to the family Ophidiasteridae.

The genus has almost cosmopolitan distribution.

Species:

Hacelia attenuata 
Hacelia bozanici 
Hacelia capensis 
Hacelia inarmata 
Hacelia raaraa 
Hacelia superba 
Hacelia tuberculata

References

Ophidiasteridae
Asteroidea genera